Hussain Sajwani (born 1953), is an Emirati billionaire businessman and the founder of the property development company, DAMAC Properties, and his private investment company, DAMAC Group.

DAMAC Properties was ranked number one on the Forbes 2017 Global 2000 list of the fastest-growing global companies based on the compound annual growth rate of revenues from 2013 to 2016. In 2018, DAMAC International signed an international hospitality partnership with global fashion house, Roberto Cavalli Group to design the interiors for AYKON Hotels that will be launched in Dubai.

Sajwani has been listed among the 100 most globally influential Arabs by Gulf Business in 2017, 2018 and 2020, and Arabian Business'100 most powerful list in 2018 and 2019.

In 2019, Sajwani's private investment firm completed the acquisition of Italian fashion group Roberto Cavalli.

According to Forbes, as of July 2022, Hussain Sajwani's is ranked in the top among richest Arabs with a net worth of US$2.7 billion.

Early life
Hussain Sajwani is the eldest of five children. Both his parents were entrepreneurs. His father was a trader with a shop at the local souk, selling watches, Parker pens, shirts and goods imported from China. Sajwani obtained a government scholarship and attended a medical college in Baghdad. After his first year, he left for the US and attended the University of Washington where he studied industrial engineering.

Career
Sajwani started his career in 1981 in the finance department in Abu Dhabi Gas Industries. Two years later, he started a catering venture, with customers including the U.S. military and  Bechtel. The venture is still operational and is now called Global Logistics Services.

In 2002, Sajwani established DAMAC Properties, one of the largest property development companies in the Middle East. The company has delivered around 27,400 homes since its inception and has over 35,000 units under various stages of development.

In October 2011, DAMAC Properties launched its hospitality division, 'DAMAC Maison Hotels & Resorts'. In 2015, the company was publicly-listed with shares traded on the Dubai Financial Market.

Some of the projects developed by DAMAC Properties include a golf course designed by Tiger Woods and managed by The Trump Organization, luxury apartments with interiors by Italian fashion-houses Versace, Fendi, and Roberto Cavalli  as well as brands such as Paramount Hotels and Resorts in partnership with Paramount Pictures.

Sajwani invested £600 million in London, UK, through its Versace-branded DAMAC Tower London in Nine Elms.

In June 2021, Hussain Sajwani resigned as the chairman of Damac Properties and offered to take the company private.

Damac’s Hussain Sajwani will launch Cavalli residences at $120m plot located at Miami on the site of collapsed Surfside condominium.

In 2022, Sajwani acquired the jeweller, De Grisogono, and announced two collaborative development projects in Dubai.

CSR
In 2017, the Hussain Sajwani – DAMAC Foundation sponsored Dubai Future Foundation's One Million Arab Coders Initiative, which was launched by UAE Vice President and Prime Minister, and Ruler of Dubai, Sheikh Mohammad bin Rashid Al Maktoum, to provide free software development training to one million young Arabs.

In February 2020, the foundation pledged AED 3 million to the Arab Hope Makers initiative's Humanitarian Cause of the Year - the construction of the Magdi Yacoub Global Heart Centre in Egypt.

In April 2020, the Hussain Sajwani-DAMAC Foundation pledged Dh 1 million to the '100 million meals' campaign, UAE's biggest food distribution drive for those affected by the coronavirus.

Personal life
Sajwani is married, with four children, and lives in Dubai. His son, Ali Sajwani, is an economics graduate from Northeastern University in Boston, US, and the general manager of operations at DAMAC Group. He was named one of the Middle East's future Stars by the Arabian Business Achievement Awards 2017, organized by Arabian Business.

His daughter, Amira Sajwani, is a graduate of University College London (UCL), where she majored in Project Management for Construction, and has a Masters in Finance from the London School of Economics (LSE). She is DAMAC's Senior Vice President – Operations.

Controversy
Sajwani was convicted by an Egyptian court over allegations of corruption in connection with a 2006 land deal in Gamsha Bay on the Red Sea. He was sentenced to 5 years in prison, but reached a settlement with the Egyptian government through an Investor-state dispute settlement arbitration and received no punishment.

Recognition
Ranked Number 15 on Hotelier Power 50 - CEO Middle East Awards 2017
Property CEO of the Year – CEO Middle East Awards 2017
Real Estate Legend 2018 - Arabian Business Real Estate Awards
Real Estate Business Leader of the Year 2018 - Gulf Business Awards 2018
Ranked 26th on Construction Week's Power 100 list in 2019
In 2020, Sajwani appeared in Cityscape Intelligence's most influential people in the MENA real estate industry.
The 100 Most Powerful People in Global Hospitality, as recognized by the International Hospitality Institute's Global 100 in June 2022.

References

Living people
1950s births
People from Dubai
University of Washington College of Engineering alumni
Emirati billionaires
Emirati people of Indian descent
Gujarati people
Khoja Ismailism